The 1964 Coupe de France Final was a football match held at Stade Olympique Yves-du-Manoir, Colombes on May 10, 1964, that saw Olympique Lyonnais defeat FC Girondins de Bordeaux 2–0 thanks to goals by Néstor Combin.

Match details

See also 
 Coupe de France 1963-64

External links 
 Coupe de France results at Rec.Sport.Soccer Statistics Foundation
 Report on French federation site

Coupe De France Final
1964
Coupe De France Final 1964
Coupe De France Final 1964
Sport in Hauts-de-Seine
May 1964 sports events in Europe
1964 in Paris